Bruno Ochman (7 September 1929 – 3 November 1990) was a Canadian wrestler. He competed in the men's freestyle welterweight at the 1956 Summer Olympics.

References

External links
 

1929 births
1990 deaths
Canadian male sport wrestlers
Olympic wrestlers of Canada
Wrestlers at the 1956 Summer Olympics
Pan American Games medalists in wrestling
Pan American Games silver medalists for Canada
Wrestlers at the 1959 Pan American Games
20th-century Canadian people